Ornithine translocase is responsible for transporting ornithine from the cytosol into the mitochondria in the urea cycle. It is highly expressed in the liver and pancreas.

Pathology
A disorder is associated with ornithine translocase deficiency, and a form of hyperammonemia.

See also
 Translocase

External links
 
 
 

Solute carrier family
Urea cycle